Türkiz Talay (born April 8, 1974) is a Turkish-German actress.

Filmography

Television

References

External links

Official website

1974 births
Living people
German people of Turkish descent
German television actresses
German film actresses
Actresses from Berlin